Charles Lewandoski (born May 18, 1985) is an American professional stock car racing driver.

Early career

Lewandoski started his career in Quarter Midgets at the age of five, racing at the Little T Speedway and in the Silver City Quarter Midget Club, both in Connecticut.  Later, he moved to the Whip City Speedway in Massachusetts, where he competed in various Sprint Car divisions, winning several races in the top-level 600cc Sprint class.

At the age of 16, Lewandoski was able to move into the NASCAR Late Model division at his home track, Stafford Motor Speedway.  On August 9, 2002, Lewandoski became the youngest-ever winner in the track's history.

At 18, Lewandoski made several starts in the NASCAR Busch North Series, now known as the NASCAR K&N Pro Series East.  He competed in the series in a limited basis that year and again in 2005, with a full campaign in 2006.  That year, he earned the series' Most Improved Driver Award.

Lewandoski spent the 2007 season as the driver coach at Dale Earnhardt, Inc., working primarily with driver Jeffrey Earnhardt.

NASCAR career
He made his NASCAR Nationwide Series debut for Fitz Motorsports in 2008 at New Hampshire Motor Speedway.  His NASCAR Camping World Truck Series debut came at New Hampshire in 2009.

In 2011 he ran a limited schedule for TriStar Motorsports, Go Green Racing, and Key Motorsports. He has not run an Xfinity Series race since 2015.

Motorsports career results

NASCAR
(key) (Bold – Pole position awarded by qualifying time. Italics – Pole position earned by points standings or practice time. * – Most laps led.)

Xfinity Series

Camping World Truck Series

Camping World East Series

References

External links
 
 

Living people
1985 births
People from Stafford Springs, Connecticut
Racing drivers from Connecticut
NASCAR drivers